Bharat Ki Chhap (Identity of India) is a 13-episode Indian TV science documentary series chronicling the history of science and technology in India from pre-historic times until the present. It was directed by filmmaker Chandita Mukherjee and funded by the Department of Science and Technology's National Council for Science and Technology Communication (NCSTC) in 1987. It was telecasted on Doordarshan every Sunday Morning. It was introduced by Professor Yash Pal.

It projected in a pragmatic way alternative viewpoints on the subject of science as pioneered in India, in contrast with western scientific endeavours. It drew support from People's Science Movement.

A companion book was later published by Comet Project titled Bhārat Ki Chhāp: A Companion Book to the Film Series by Chayanika Shah, Suhas Paranjape, Swatija Manorama.

Episodes 

A total of 13 episodes were released.

References 

Documentaries about historical events
History of science
Indian television series
Hindi-language television shows
Indian documentary television series